Massimiliano Bruno (born  4 June 1970) is an Italian director, screenwriter, playwright and actor.

Life and career 
Born in Rome into a family of Calabrian origins, Bruno formed as an actor in a drama laboratory "Torre Spaccata". He started his professional career in the Roman underground theatre, both as an actor and a playwright.

Bruno made his professional debut as a screenwriter in 2000, for the television film Non ho l'età. In 2006 he collaborated to the screenplay of the box office hit Notte prima degli esami. He made his directorial film debut in 2011 with Escort in Love, which won the Nastro d'Argento for Best Comedy Film. For this film he was also nominated for a David di Donatello for Best New Director and for a Nastro d'Argento in the same category.

Selected filmography  
 Notte prima degli esami (2006, screenwriter) 
 Notte prima degli esami – Oggi (2007, screenwriter) 
 This Night Is Still Ours (2008, actor and screenwriter) 
 Buongiorno papà (2013, screenwriter) 
 Many Kisses Later (2009, screenwriter)
 Questo mondo è per te (2011, actor) 
 Boris: The Film (2011, actor)
 Escort in Love (2011, actor, director and screenwriter)
 Viva l'Italia (2012, actor, director and screenwriter) 
 Happily Mixed Up (2014, actor, director and screenwriter)
 The Last Will Be the Last (2015, director and screenwriter)
 Ignorance Is Bliss (2017, director and screenwriter)
 All You Need Is Crime (2019, actor, director and screenwriter)
 Ritorno al crimine (2020, actor, director and screenwriter)
 C'era una volta il crimine (2022, actor, director and screenwriter)

References

External links 
  

1970 births
Living people 
Italian film directors
Italian theatre directors
Italian screenwriters
Male actors from Rome
Film people from Rome
Italian male film actors
Italian male stage actors
Italian male television actors
Italian dramatists and playwrights
Italian male screenwriters
People of Calabrian descent